This is a list of University of Oxford people in religion.  Many were students at one (or more) of the colleges of the university, and others held fellowships at a college.

This list forms part of a series of lists of people associated with the University of Oxford – for other lists, please see the main article List of University of Oxford people.

Christianity

Saints
John Boste (The Queen's)
Alexander Briant (Hart Hall)
Edmund Campion (St John's)
Thomas of Hereford (Chancellor)
Richard of Chichester (Chancellor)
Richard Gwyn
Cuthbert Mayne (St John's)
Thomas More (Canterbury Hall)
John Henry Newman (Trinity)
Edmund of Abingdon (Grammar, Arts, Theology)
John Roberts (St John's)
Ralph Sherwin (Exeter)
Simon Stock (college or hall not known)

Blessed

Thomas Abel (college or hall not known)
Thomas Cottam (Brasenose)
Thomas Ford (Trinity)
John Forrest (c. 1500, BD, possibly DD)
John Ingram (New College)
Edward James (St John's)
George Nichols (Brasenose)
John Duns Scotus (college or hall not known)
John Shert (Brasenose)
John Story (Broadgates Hall)

Antipope

Antipope Alexander V antipope 1409-10

Cardinals

Excluding Cardinals who were Archbishop of Canterbury or York

William Allen (Oriel and St Mary Hall) Cardinal 1587
Joseph Cordeiro Archbishop of Karachi, Pakistan and Cardinal 1973-1994
William Heard (Balliol) Dean of the Sacred Roman Rota 1958, Cardinal 1959
Basil Hume (St Benet's Hall) archbishop of Westminster and Cardinal 1976–99
Henry Manning (Balliol) archbishop of Westminster 1865-92 and Cardinal 1875-92
John Henry Newman (Trinity) Cardinal 1879
George Pell (Campion Hall) archbishop of Melbourne 1996–2001, archbishop of Sydney 2001–14, Cardinal 2003-23
Philip Repyngdon bishop of Lincoln 1404–19, Cardinal 1408-24
Reverend Mathew Nott of Oldbury

Archbishops of Canterbury

Edmund Rich 1233-40
John Peckham 1279-92
Robert Winchelsey 1294-1313
John de Stratford 1333-48 (Merton)
Thomas Bradwardine 1349-49 (Balliol)
William Whittlesey 1368-74
William Courtenay 1381-96 (Stapledon Hall)
Thomas Arundel 1397–98, 1397-1414 (Oriel)
Henry Chichele 1414-43 (New College and All Souls)
John Kemp 1452-54 (Merton) Cardinal
Thomas Bourchier 1454-86 Cardinal
John Morton 1486-1500 (Balliol) Cardinal
Thomas Langton 1501 (The Queen's)
Henry Deane 1501-03 (Exeter)
William Warham 1503-32 (New College)
Reginald Pole 1557-58 (Magdalen and Corpus Christi) Cardinal
George Abbot 1611-33 (Balliol and University)
William Laud 1633-45 (St John's)
William Juxon 1660-63 (St John's)
Gilbert Sheldon 1663-77 (Trinity and All Souls)
William Wake 1716-37 (Christ Church)
John Potter 1737-47 (University, Lincoln, and Christ Church)
Thomas Secker 1758-68 (Exeter)
Charles Longley 1862-68 (Balliol)
Archibald Tait 1868-82 (Balliol)
Frederick Temple 1896-1902 (Balliol)
Randall Davidson 1903-28 (Trinity)
Cosmo Lang 1928-42 (Balliol)
William Temple 1942-44 (Balliol)
Geoffrey Fisher (later Baron Fisher of Lambeth) 1945-61 (Exeter)
Robert Runcie (later Baron Runcie of Cuddesdon) 1980-91 (Brasenose)
Rowan Williams (later Baron Williams of Oystermouth) 2002-12 (Christ Church and Wadham)

Archbishops of York
Walter de Gray 1216–55
William Greenfield 1306–15
Thomas Arundel 1388–96  (Oriel)
Richard le Scrope 1398–1405
John Kemp 1426–52 (Merton) Cardinal
George Neville 1465–76 (Balliol)
Thomas Rotherham 1480–1500 (Lincoln)
Christopher Bainbridge 1508–14 (The Queen's)
Thomas Wolsey 1514–30 (Magdalen) Cardinal
Thomas Young 1561–68
Tobias Matthew 1606–28 (University, Christ Church, and St John's)
Accepted Frewen 1660–64 (Magdalen)
John Dolben 1683–86 (Christ Church)
Lancelot Blackburne 1724-43 (Christ Church)
William Markham 1776–1807 (Christ Church)
Charles Thomas Longley 1860–62 (Balliol)
William Thomson 1862–90 (The Queen's)
Cosmo Lang 1909–28 (Balliol)
William Temple 1929–42 (Balliol)
Cyril Garbett 1942-55 (Keble)
Stuart Blanch (later Baron Blanch) 1975–83 (St Catherine's)
David Hope (later Baron Hope of Thornes) 1995-2005 (Linacre)

Other archbishops, presiding bishops, and metropolitans

Hugh Boulter (Christ Church and Magdalen) bishop of Bristol 1719–24, archbishop of Armagh 1724-42
A. G. Edwards (Jesus) bishop of St Asaph 1889–1934, archbishop of Wales 1920-34
Richard FitzRalph (Balliol) archbishop of Armagh 1346-60
Francis Oliver Green-Wilkinson (Magdalen) bishop of Lusaka 1951–70, archbishop of Central Africa 1962–70
Frank Tracy Griswold (Oriel) presiding bishop, Episcopal Church in the United States of America 1997-2006
David Hand (Oriel) consecrated bishop 1950, archbishop of Papua New Guinea 1977-83
Trevor Huddleston (Christ Church) archbishop of the Indian Ocean and bishop of Mauritius 1978-83
Peter Jensen archbishop of Sydney and metropolitan of New South Wales 2001-
Narcissus Marsh (Exeter and St Alban Hall) archbp of Cashel 1691–94, archbishop of Dublin 1694–1703, archbishop of Armagh 1703-13
David Moxon (St Peter's) bishop of Waikato 1993-, Archbishop of the New Zealand Dioceses and co-presiding Bishop of the Anglican Church in Aotearoa, New Zealand and the Pacific 2006- 
Edward Francis Paget (Christ Church) bishop of Mashonaland 1925–57, archbishop of Central Africa 1955-57
Paul Alfred Reeves (St Peter's) bishop of Waiapu 1971–79, bishop of Auckland 1979–85, archbishop and primate of New Zealand 1980-85
Glyn Simon (Jesus) bishop of Llandaff 1957–71, archbishop of Wales 1968–71
George Stone (Christ Church) archbishop of Armagh 1747-64
Timothy Ware (Kallistos) (Magdalen and Pembroke) Orthodox bishop of Diokleia 1982-, Metropolitan 2007-
Gwilym Owen Williams (Jesus) bishop of Bangor 1957–82, archbishop of Wales 1971-82
Daniel Wilson (St Edmund Hall) bishop of Calcutta and metropolitan of India and Ceylon 1832-58
John Charles Wright archbishop of Sydney 1909–33, primate of Australia 1910-33

Other bishops

Post-Reformation bishops are Anglican unless described otherwise

Clergy and other ministers

The following are clergymen and other Christian ministers who are primarily known for their non-theological contributions to the Church, although some may also have been significant scholars

Fitzherbert Adams (Lincoln) rector of Lincoln College and prebendary of Durham Cathedral 1685-1719
Simon Bailey (Regent's Park) rector of Dinnington, writer, art collector
Thomas Bastard (New College)
Peter Beck dean of ChristChurch Cathedral (Christchurch, New Zealand) since 2002
Derek Pattinson (The Queen's) Secretary-General of the General Synod of the Church of England 1972-90
Richard Meux Benson (Christ Church) founder Society of St John the Evangelist
Adam Blakeman (Christ Church) minister of Stratford, Connecticut 1639-65
William Henry Bliss (Magdalen) sometime tutor to King Victor Emmanuel III
Thomas Bradley (Exeter) chaplain who ministered to Charles I at his execution
Thomas Bray (All Souls) missionary to Maryland 1699–1700, rector of St Botolph Aldgate 1706-30
Thomas Charles (Jesus) Anglican priest and Methodist
Richard William Church (Wadham and Oriel) Dean of St Paul's 1871-90
Thomas Coke (Jesus) father of Methodist missions and successor to John Wesley
John Davenport after whom Davenport College, Yale is named; co-founder Colony of New Haven & Hopkins School
Harold Davidson (Exeter) rector of Stiffkey 1906-32
Percy Dearmer (Christ Church) liturgist, socialist, Professor of King's College London, Canon of Westminster
Verrier Elwin (Merton and Wycliffe Hall)
John Feckenham (Gloucester Hall) Dean of St Paul's 1554–56, Abbot of Westminster 1556-60
Edward Drax Free (St John's)
Bernard Green (St Benet's) Catholic priest and monk of Ampleforth
Michael Green (Exeter and Wycliffe Hall) priest, professor, and evangelist
Robin Griffith-Jones (New College and Lincoln) The Reverend and Valiant Master of the Temple 1999-
Bede Griffiths (Magdalen)
Nicky Gumbel (Wycliffe Hall) Asst Curate Holy Trinity Brompton 1986–2005, Vicar 2005-, head of Alpha 1990-
William Ralph Inge (Hertford) Dean of St Paul's 1911-34
Cyril Jackson (Christ Church) tutor to George IV; declined bpric of Oxford (1799) & archbpric of Armagh (1800)
Hewlett Johnson (Wadham) "Red" Dean of Canterbury 1931-63
R. T. Kendall (Regent's Park) Minister of Westminster Chapel 1977-2002
Vicesimus Knox (St John's) essayist and sometime Head Master of Tonbridge School
Christopher Lewis (Ripon Coll Cuddesdon & Christ Church) Dean of St Albans 1994–2003, of Christ Church 2003-
Alexander Heriot Mackonochie (Wadham) Master of the Society of the Holy Cross 1863–75
Malachi Martin (Not known) Author and exorcist
John Mason (All Souls) Dean of Winchester 1549-54
Edward Meyrick Goulburn (Balliol and Merton) Head Master of Rugby 1849–57, Dean of Norwich 1866-89
Alexander Nowell (Brasenose) Dean of St Paul's 1560-1602
Richard Pace Secretary of State 1516–26, Dean of St Paul's 1519-36
A. P. Stanley (Balliol & University) Dean of Westminster 1863–81, Rector of St Andrews 1874-77
Montague Summers (Trinity) poet and expert on Gothic literature, witchcraft, vampires, and werewolves
Chad Varah (Keble) Rector of St Stephen Walbrook 1953–2003, founder of The Samaritans 1953
Lawrence Washington (Brasenose) great-great-grandfather of George Washington
Charles Wesley (Christ Church) hymn writer and brother of John Wesley
John Wesley (Christ Church and Lincoln) founder of Methodism
George Whitefield (Pembroke) founder of Methodism
John Yonge (New College) Master of the Rolls 1508–16, Dean of York 1514-16

Islam

Rashid Khalidi (St Antony's) Edward Said Prof of Arab Studies & Head, Middle East Inst, Columbia Univ 2003-
Martin Lings (Abu Bakr Siraj Ad-Din) (Magdalen) Keeper of Oriental Printed Books & MSS, British Museum 1970-73
David Samuel Margoliouth
Ali Mazrui (Nuffield)
Josef W. Meri (Wolfson)
Farhan Nizami (Wadham, St Cross, and Magdalen)
Fazlur Rahman
Tariq Ramadan (St Antony's)

Judaism
 Rabbi Shmuley Boteach, founder of the Oxford University L'Chaim Society

Chief Rabbis of the United Hebrew Congregations of the Commonwealth

Lionel Blue 1930–2016 (Balliol)
Israel Brodie 1948-65 (Balliol)
Moses Gaster
Martin Goodman (Wolfson)
Jacob Neusner (Lincoln)
Jonathan Sacks 1948–2020 (New College; 1991-)

Bahá'í

Shoghi Effendi 1919-1921 (Balliol) Guardian of the Bahá'í Faith 1921-57

Buddhism

Chögyam Trungpa

Hinduism

Shaunaka Rishi Das

See also

A select list of former Rhodes Scholars
List of Vice-Chancellors of the University of Oxford
List of Current Heads of Oxford University Colleges, Societies, and Halls

External links
British Society for the History of Mathematics: Oxford individuals
Famous Oxford Alumni
Short Alumni List Published by Oxford

References

Oxford, Religion
 Religion